Elmer Lee "Buddy" Charleton (March 6, 1938 – January 25, 2011), was an American country musician and teacher. Known primarily for his work as a pedal steel guitarist in Ernest Tubb's Texas Troubadours band, Charleton played on numerous songs such as Waltz across Texas and instrumentals Cool it, Honey Fingers, Almost to Tulsa and Rhodes-Bud Boogie. When Buddy's touring career came to a close, he became involved with Billy Cooper's Music in Orange, VA working as a pedal steel instructor for many years. Buddy's teaching work greatly influenced the next generation of pedal steel guitarists.

References

External links
 Official website of Buddy Charleton
 

Pedal steel guitarists
1938 births
2011 deaths
20th-century American guitarists